G.I. Gurdjieff: Sacred Hymns is an album of music written by George Gurdjieff and Thomas de Hartmann, performed by pianist Keith Jarrett which was released on the ECM label in 1980.

Background 
Jarrett's interest in Gurdjieff dated back to the 1960s and his association with Charles Lloyd, who was "on a Gurdjieff kick" at the time, and whose copies of Gurdjieff's books Jarrett read. Jarrett eventually immersed himself in Gurdjieff's writings and music, the latter having been transcribed by Russian composer Thomas de Hartmann. At some point, a member of the London Gurdjieff Foundation suggested that Jarrett record some of Gurdjieff's music, and Jarrett accepted. The resulting recording marked the first occasion on which Gurdjieff's music, as notated by de Hartmann, was made available to the public, and was a major catalyst in bringing the music to the attention of a mainstream audience.

Jarrett later reflected: "It was the most appropriate thing for me to record at the time, given that I knew more about it than just the music, and also given that I was asked by [a member of] the London group whether I would do it or not. That was enough for me. But it was also an exercise in disappearing personality. In the so-called Gurdjieff world, personality is not a positive thing... So I used that recording as an exercise in not inflicting that music with my personality." (Not surprisingly, Jarrett abstained almost completely from the use of improvisation on the album.) Jarrett stopped reading Gurdjieff's writings in the early 1980s, but stated: "the impression shouldn't be that I have at some point or other refuted it."

Reception
The Allmusic review by Richard S. Ginell awarded the album 3 stars, noting, "The whole record has a serene dignity, even at its loudest levels, that gets to you, and that should be enough for the devout Jarrett following. As for others -- well, it's definitely not a Top Ten choice for a basic Jarrett collection".

Track listing
All compositions by George Ivanovich Gurdjieff and Thomas de Hartmann
 "Reading of Sacred Books" - 8:19
 "Prayer and Despair" - 3:50
 "Religious Ceremony" - 4:07
 "Hymn" - 2:45
 "Orthodox Hymn from Asia Minor" - 3:04
 "Hymn for Good Friday" - 1:35
 "Hymn" - 2:30
 "Hymn for Easter Thursday" - 3:26
 "Hymn to the Endless Creator" - 2:04
 "Hymn from a Great Temple" - 4:30
 "The Story of the Resurrection Of Christ" - 1:37
 "Holy Affirming - Holy Denying - Holy Reconciling" - 4:14
 "Easter Night Procession" - 2:54
 "Easter Hymn" - 5:49
 "Meditation" - 1:42

Personnel 
 Keith Jarrett] – piano

Production
 Manfred Eicher - producer
 Kathelin Hoffman - research and co-ordination
 Martin Wieland - recording engineer
 Barbara Wojirsch - cover design and layout

References 

ECM Records albums
Keith Jarrett albums
1980 albums
Albums produced by Manfred Eicher
Instrumental albums